Hazel Hannan, former Member of the House of Keys (MHK), was previously the Deputy Speaker of the House of Keys and an Education Minister and then Minister of Agriculture, Fisheries and Forestry in the Isle of Man Government.  She was elected in 1986 as an independent MHK for Peel, after a failed attempt 5 years earlier standing for Mec Vannin.  She is the President of Peel AFC.

She was defeated in the 2006 general election by Tim Crookall MHK. Manx Radio exit polls had the incumbent Mrs. Hannan displaying an initial lead.

Governmental positions 

 Minister of Education, 1991–1995
 Minister of Agriculture, Fisheries and Forestry, 1995–1999

References 

Manx women in politics
Year of birth missing (living people)
Living people
Mec Vannin politicians
Members of the House of Keys 1986–1991
Members of the House of Keys 1991–1996
Members of the House of Keys 1996–2001
Members of the House of Keys 2001–2006
20th-century British women politicians
21st-century British women politicians